Old Clunie Castle is a ruined 13th century castle near Clunie, Perth and Kinross, Scotland.

History
Built upon a hillock on the western shores of Loch Clunie, guarding a trail between the Upper Tay valley and Strathmore. The castle replaced a hunting lodge used by Kenneth MacAlpin, King of the Picts, as a base for hunting in the nearby royal forest of Clunie. King Edward I of England stayed four nights in 1296 at the castle during his invasion of Scotland, before travelling to Inverquiech Castle.

After becoming disused, a new L-plan tower house castle for the Bishops of Dunkeld was built in the 16th century on a crannog within the adjacent loch.

References

Ruined castles in Perth and Kinross